Collateral may refer to:

Business and finance
 Collateral (finance), a borrower's pledge of specific property to a lender, to secure repayment of a loan
 Marketing collateral, in marketing and sales

Arts, entertainment, and media
 Collateral (album), an album by NERVO (2015)
 Collateral (film), a thriller film starring Tom Cruise and Jamie Foxx (2004)
 "Collateral" (Justified), an episode of the TV series Justified
 Collateral (TV series), a four-part BBC television series (2018)

Anatomy
 Collateral ligament
 a branch in an anatomical structure, e.g. the superior ulnar collateral artery or the prevertebral ganglia, also known as collateral ganglia
 Collateral circulation, the alternate circulation around a blocked artery or vein via another path, such as nearby minor vessels

See also
 Collateral adjective
 Collateral contract
 Collateral damage
 Collateral (kinship)
 Collateral estoppel
 Collateral management
 Collateral source rule
 Collateral succession
 Collateral warranty
 Collateralization the development of alternative blood vessels to serve an inadequately supplied organ or vascular bed
 Collateralized debt obligation